Mateusz Cichocki (born 31 January 1992) is a Polish professional footballer who plays as a centre-back for Radomiak Radom.

Career

Radomiak Radom
On 29 May 2019, it was confirmed that Cichocki had joined I liga club Radomiak Radom after two seasons with Zagłębie Sosnowiec.

Honours

Club
Legia Warsaw
Ekstraklasa: 2013–14

Radomiak Radom
I liga: 2020–21

References

External links
 
 

1992 births
Living people
Polish footballers
Poland youth international footballers
Poland under-21 international footballers
Association football defenders
Arka Gdynia players
Ząbkovia Ząbki players
Legia Warsaw players
Ruch Chorzów players
Zagłębie Sosnowiec players
Radomiak Radom players
Ekstraklasa players
I liga players
Footballers from Warsaw